Bathycongrus parviporus is an eel in the family Congridae (conger/garden eels). It was described by Emma Stanislavovna Karmovskaya in 2011. It is a tropical, marine eel which is known from the South China Sea and central Vietnam.

References

parviporus
Fish described in 2011